Mount Holly (also Fair Oak) is an unincorporated community in Clermont County, in the U.S. state of Ohio.

History
A post office called Mount Holly was established in 1866, and remained in operation until 1935. Besides the post office, Mount Holly had a country store.

References

Unincorporated communities in Clermont County, Ohio
Unincorporated communities in Ohio